Der Ort des Terrors ("The Place of Terrors") is a nine-volume German-language encyclopedia series of the Nazi concentration camps and subcamps, published between 2005 and 2009. The first volume centers around the Nazi concentration camps and volumes 2-7 focuses on the 20+ main camps and approximately 1,000 subordinate camps.   

The series has been compared to the first volume of Encyclopedia of Camps and Ghettos, 1933–1945, an English-language encyclopedia with the same scope.

Volumes
 Die Organisation des Terrors. 2005. .
 Frühe Lager, Dachau, Emslandlager. 2005. .
 Sachsenhausen, Buchenwald. 2006. .
 Flossenbürg, Mauthausen, Ravensbrück. 2006. .
 Hinzert, Auschwitz, Neuengamme. 2007. .
 Natzweiler, Groß-Rosen, Stutthof. 2007. .
 Niederhagen/Wewelsburg, Lublin-Majdanek, Arbeitsdorf, Herzogenbusch (Vught), Bergen-Belsen, Mittelbau-Dora. 2008. .
 Riga, Warschau, Vaivara, Kaunas, Płaszów, Kulmhof/Chełmno, Bełzec, Sobibór, Treblinka. 2008. .
 Arbeitserziehungslager, Ghettos, Jugendschutzlager, Polizeihaftlager, Sonderlager, Zigeunerlager, Zwangsarbeiterlager. 2009. .

References

Encyclopedias of history
German-language encyclopedias
2005 non-fiction books
2006 non-fiction books
2007 non-fiction books
2008 non-fiction books
2009 non-fiction books
Nazi concentration camps